The following Confederate Army units and commanders fought in the Battle of Belmont of the American Civil War. The Union order of battle is listed separately.

Abbreviations used

Military Rank
 BG = Brigadier General
 Col = Colonel
 Ltc= Lieutenant Colonel
 Maj = Major
 Cpt= Captain
 Lt = 1st Lieutenant

Confederate Forces

First Division, Western Department
MG Leonidas Polk

Units in reserve or near Columbus

See also

 Missouri in the American Civil War
 Kentucky in the American Civil War

References
 Hughes, Nathaniel Cheairs. The Battle of Belmont:  Grant Strikes South (Chapel Hill, NC:  The University of North Carolina Press), 1991.  

American Civil War orders of battle